Bill Holden (1923-2011) was a British speedway rider.

Speedway career
Bill Holden rode for Southampton Saints (1950-1, 1957), Poole Pirates 1951–56, 1958) and England (1952). He won the Division 3 championship with Poole in 1951 and the following year won the Division 2 title with Poole. In 1955, he won a third title when Poole won Division 2 again.

He is still regarded by some as one of the best riders ever to don the distinctive blue and white skull and crossbones race jacket. Holden was entered into the Poole Speedway Hall of Fame in 2008 having scored 1,599 points in 639 races.

Personal life
He is uncle to former Exeter Falcons, Poole and England rider Kevin Holden and father to former Weymouth junior Paul Holden.

References 

1923 births
2011 deaths
Poole Pirates riders
Southampton Saints riders
British speedway riders